Euander is a genus of dirt-colored seed bugs in the family Rhyparochromidae. There are at least four described species in Euander, found in Australia.

Species
These four species belong to the genus Euander:
 Euander cicero Gross, 1962
 Euander lacertosus (Erichson, 1842) (strawberry bug)
 Euander multicolorata (Distant, 1918)
 Euander torquatus (Erichson, 1842)

References

External links

 

Rhyparochromidae